Gorakhpur Literary Fest is an annual literary festival held in Gorakhpur, Uttar Pradesh, India.

History

2021
Gorakhpur Literary Fest will be organized during 18–19 December 2021.

2020
Gorakhpur Literary Fest was scheduled for 1–2 February 2020. Venue was St. Andrew Degree College, Gorakhpur.

2018
Gorakhpur Literary Fest was held during 6–7 October 2018.

2017
Gorakhpur Literary Fest was held during 8–9 April 2017. Fest was inaugurated by then President of Sahitya Academy Prof. Vishwanath Prasad Tiwari and writer Chitra Mridul.

References

External links 
 

Literary festivals in India
Culture of Gorakhpur